Stryn is the administrative centre of Stryn Municipality in Vestland county, Norway. The village is located on the shore of a small bay off of the main Nordfjorden. The mouth of the river Stryneelva is in the village.

It is the largest settlement in the municipality and it is home to the municipal administration, a school, and commercial centre. The village sits at the intersection of Norwegian National Road 15 and Norwegian County Road 60, a major crossroads in the Inner Nordfjord region.

References

Villages in Vestland
Stryn